American singer-songwriter, pianist, and music producer Alicia Keys has written and produced for her five studio albums, in collaborations, for other artists and for film and theater. Keys began composing songs she would later include on her debut studio album, Songs in A Minor at age 14. She signed with Columbia Records at age 15, later leaving Columbia to sign with Arista Records and then J Records. Prior to the release of Songs in A Minor in June 2001, her song "Girlfriend" was released to US radio in earlier in the year as a promotional song "to introduce" Keys. It was co-written by Keys with Jermaine Dupri and Joshua Thompson and contains a sample of Ol' Dirty Bastard's track "Brooklyn Zoo". The album's official first single, "Fallin'", written and produced solely by Keys, topped the US Billboard Hot 100 chart. "A Woman's Worth", written by Keys and Erika Rose, is a "jazz-tinged" song with lyrical content on how men should treat and respect women.

Keys released her second album, The Diary of Alicia Keys, in December 2003. In addition to working with previous collaborator Kerry Brothers, Jr., Keys also collaborated with several others for the album. Keys co-produced the song "Heartburn" with Timbaland and worked with Kanye West on "You Don't Know My Name". Several of the songs were written solely by Keys, including "Harlem's Nocturne", "Dragon Days", "Feeling U, Feeling Me" (Interlude) and the single, "If I Ain't Got You", and she produced most of the album herself. A music journalist for The Times wrote that The Diary of Alicia Keys "confirmed her place in musical history". Her third studio, As I Am, was released in November 2007. Keys wrote several of the songs with collaborator Kerry Brothers, Jr., including "Go Ahead" and "Where Do We Go from Here". She also collaborated with Linda Perry on the songs "The Thing About Love", "Sure Looks Good to Me" and "Superwoman", for which she was awarded the Grammy Award for Best Female R&B Vocal Performance in 2009. The songs "As I Am" (Intro) and "Prelude to a Kiss" were written solely by Keys.

The Element of Freedom, Keys' fourth studio album, was released in December 2009; it was preceded by the lead single "Doesn't Mean Anything", co-written with Kerry Brothers, Jr. During this time, Keys collaborated with Jay-Z on "Empire State of Mind". Keys recorded her version of the song for The Element of Freedom entitled "Empire State of Mind (Part II) Broken Down"; she also collaborated with Alejandro Sanz on "Looking for Paradise". On The Element of Freedom, she wrote a number of the songs with longtime collaborator Kerry Brothers, Jr., including "Love is My Disease" and "This Bed". Keys solely wrote and produced "That's How Strong My Love Is". She also collaborated with Drake on "Un-Thinkable (I'm Ready)" and featured Beyoncé on "Put It in a Love Song". Keys' fifth album, Girl on Fire was released in November 2012. The title track was accompanied by two remixes: one featuring rap verses by Nicki Minaj, and the other Keys signing in a stripped back production. Keys collaborated with Scottish singer Emeli Sandé on three songs for the album: "101", "Not Even the King" and the second single, "Brand New Me", a piano ballad about personal growth, produced by Keys.

Songs

See also
 Alicia Keys discography
 List of awards and nominations received by Alicia Keys

References

External links
Official website 

Keys, Alicia